Carri is both a surname and a given name. Notable people with the name include:

Surname
Albertina Carri (born 1973), Argentine screenwriter, film director and producer
Daniele Delli Carri (born 1971), Italian footballer

Given name
Carri Leigh Goodwin (1989–2009)
Carri Munden, English fashion designer

See also

Cari (name)
Carrie (disambiguation)
Carry (name)